Inverugie Castle or Cheyne's Tower is the ruins of a motte-and-bailey castle in Aberdeenshire, Scotland. It is a scheduled ancient monument.

Location 

History 
A defensive structure was first built at Inverugie by the Cheyne (Le Chen) family in the 13th or 14th century.

In 1345, at the death of Reginald le Chen, Baron Inverugie, the estate of Inverugie had passed to the Keith Earl Marischals, who had their main seat at the coastal fortress of Dunnottar Castle (via marriage of Edward Keith and the heiress Marjory, daughter of Reginald le Chen  and Helen de Strathearn). Around 1660 the Keiths built what is the current, but now ruined, castle, lying south of the original wooden motte.

In the 19th century, an oak heraldry shield was found in a local cottage with the arms of William Keith, 7th Earl Marischal and its date was carved as 1660.

The Keith lands were forfeited after the Jacobite Rebellion and some time after 1745 the Inverugie estate passed from the Keiths to James Ferguson the third Laird of Pitfour who kept the building in a perfect state until he died in 1820. However, the fifth Laird stripped the Castle of all the restoration undertaken and his successor exacerbated the neglect even further.

By 1890, the Castle was in poor condition and was unable to withstand inclement weather. Gales in April 1890 resulted in the collapse of some walls and the stair tower. It was declared unsafe by the Local Authority following further storms on New Years Day 1899. The estate factor, William Ainslie, probably acting under instruction from the Laird at that time, arranged to have much of what was left of the ruins blown up, weakening the remaining structure. Within a fortnight, little remained of the castle.

Charles McKean described the castle as "a splendid double-courtyard Renaissance chateau [consisting] of a four-storey block with circular angle towers and a stair turret".

William Burnes or William Burness (1721 – 1784), the father of Robert Burns the poet, was born at Clochnahill Farm, Dunnottar, and trained as a gardener at Inverugie Castle, before moving to Ayrshire.

References

Bibliography

External links
 Inverugie Castle Virtual Tour

Castles in Aberdeenshire
Clan Cheyne
Scheduled Ancient Monuments in Aberdeenshire